Tang Kei Shan (born 4 November 1961) is a Hong Kong diver. He competed in the men's 3 metre springboard event at the 1988 Summer Olympics.

References

External links
 

1961 births
Living people
Hong Kong male divers
Olympic divers of Hong Kong
Divers at the 1988 Summer Olympics
Place of birth missing (living people)